Logan is a locality in Victoria, Australia. It is located at the intersection of Bendigo-St Arnaud Road (Wimmera Highway) and Logan-Wedderburn Road in the Loddon Shire. The Australian Bureau of Statistics does not calculate its population, although the town is estimated to have approximately 15 people. According to the Victorian Electoral Commission the locality has 45 registered voters.

The Logan Pub (or Avoca Forest Hotel) has accommodation and hosts events.

History
Logan was once a larger town during the Victorian Gold Rush. There was a post office, school, two churches, a community hall, a general store and other buildings. Logan Post Office opened on 18 January 1886 and closed in 1974. The town had a medium-sized oval which was home ground for a local Australian Rules football team.

There have been three pubs in the town's history - the first two have been demolished.

Gallery

References

External links

Logan Pub official website

Towns in Victoria (Australia)
Shire of Loddon
Mining towns in Victoria (Australia)